Sammie Lee Burroughs (born June 21, 1973) is a former American football linebacker who played two seasons with the Indianapolis Colts of the National Football League. He first enrolled at Mt. San Antonio College before transferring to Portland State University. He was also a member of the Miami Dolphins.

References

External links
Just Sports Stats

Living people
1973 births
Players of American football from California
American football linebackers
African-American players of American football
Mt. SAC Mounties football players
Portland State Vikings football players
Indianapolis Colts players
Sportspeople from Pomona, California
21st-century African-American sportspeople
20th-century African-American sportspeople